Daurama or Magajiya Daurama (c. 9th century) was a ruler of the Hausa people who, as the Last Kabara of Daura, presided over the upheaval that saw a transference of power from the matriarchal royal system of the Hausa people. Oral traditions remember her as the founding "queen grandmother" of the Hausa empire started in the area we know today as the monarchies of northern Niger and Nigeria. The story of Magajiya Daurama is partially told in the legend of Bayajidda.

Magajiya Daurama ruled a state known as Daura, after the town with the same name, today also an emirate in Katsina State, Nigeria. The original capital of the state was called Tsohon Birni ("Old Town"); and during her reign Daurama moved the capital to the town of Daura, which was named after her.

References

9th-century women rulers
Hausa people
History of Nigeria
Nigerian royalty
History of women in Nigeria
Queens regnant in Africa
Women rulers in Africa